The One Million Pound Challenge (OMPC) during Earth Week was created by Advanced Technology Recycling (ATR) to raise awareness to the importance of recycling. The goal was to keep more than one million pounds of electronics out of landfills by properly disposing of them.
The primary objective of the One Million Pound Challenge (OMPC) is to bring out Awareness for Earth Day. The event was created to include Earth Day and spans an entire week, where corporate sponsors encourage their employees to help collect e-Waste.
ATR broke the Guinness Book of World Records for the Most Consumer Electronics Recycled in One Week (Multiple Locations) on April 25, 2015 during the OMPC.

References

External links

 http://www.epa.gov/osw/conserve/materials/ecycling/donate.htm
 http://www.guinnessworldrecords.com/world-records/most-consumer-electronics-recycled-in-one-week-%28multiple-locations%29
 http://services.northsachamber.com/events/details/one-million-pound-challenge-for-earth-day-2015-6266
 http://www.wastedive.com/press-release/20150406-atr-goes-for-guinness-world-book-of-record-for-earth-week/
 http://www.mlive.com/business/west-michigan/index.ssf/2015/05/e-recycler_sets_world_record_b.html
 http://www2.erie.gov/exec/index.php?q=41515-erie-county-employees-accept-quotone-million-poundquot-challenge
 http://www.mlive.com/business/west-michigan/index.ssf/2013/04/west_michigan_companies_and_no.html

Challenges